The Departmental Council of Meuse is the deliberative assembly of the Meuse department of France. Its headquarters are in Bar-le-Duc, capital of the department. 

The departmental council consists of 34 departmental councilors, elected from the 17 cantons of Meuse for a six year term.

President  
The current president of the departmental council is Jérôme Dumont (DVD) since the 2021 elections, succeeding Claude Léonard.

Vice-presidents 
To support the president, 10 vice-presidents are appointed with the delegation of functions.

References

See also  
 Meuse 
 Departmental councils of France

External links 
  - Official website of the Council

Meuse (department)
Meuse